is a Japanese television series starring Haruka Fukuhara, Aoi Yoshikura, Mariya Nagao, Yurika Nakamura, and Jun Amaki. The series focuses on the lives of five aspiring voice actresses who live together in a dorm, and follows their goal of becoming established in the voice acting industry. It premiered on TV Asahi on April 8, 2018. The series ran for ten episodes, with the last episode premiering on June 10, 2018. The series is a spin-off of the Pretty Cure multimedia franchise, but does not directly feature its story or universe.

Plot

The series follows Makoto Kikuchi, the daughter of a grocery shop owner who has no experience in voice acting or acting. Her life changes when she is scouted to be a voice actress, which leads her to live in a dorm with four other newcomers: Ryōko Ochiai, a former child actress, Ren Inaba, a fan of the PreCure franchise, Asami Kuriyama, who Makoto later considers to be her rival, and Konatsu Morimoto, who originally hails from Kansai. The series depicts their journey of becoming voice actors, showing their voice acting lessons and other events in their lives.

Characters

Portrayed by: Haruka Fukuhara
She is the daughter of a grocery shop owner. She knew nothing about voice acting until she was scouted.

Portrayed by: Yurika Nakamura
A young girl who is later considered by Makoto to be her rival.

Portrayed by: Mariya Nagao
An otaku who has deep admiration for the PreCure franchise.

Portrayed by: Jun Amaki
A girl originally from the Kansai region who tends to speak in the Kansai dialect. She serves as the group's moodmaker.

Portrayed by: Aoi Yoshikura
She is a former child actress who decided to pivot to voice acting. She is the eldest among five children and takes care of her four siblings.

A popular voice actress who notices Makoto's talent during an acting test. She serves as a mentor for the group.

Production and release
The series was produced as part of the franchise's 15th anniversary. Produced by Asahi Broadcasting Corporation and Fine Entertainment, the series is directed by Natsuki Seta, Toshiki Sōma, and Kyōhei Tamazawa, and is written by Kōta Fukuhara and Shinya Hokimoto. The series premiered on TV Asahi on April 8, 2018 and will run for 10 episodes. Voice actors Haruka Tomatsu, Daisuke Namikawa, Noriko Hidaka, and Mitsuo Iwata appear as themselves in the series. Footage of Tomatsu performing at a concert the song "Q&A Recital", used as the opening theme to the anime series My Little Monster, is used in the series' seventh episode. The series' ending theme is "It's Show Time!" by Tomatsu and Haruka Fukuhara.

References

External links
Official website 

TV Asahi television dramas
2018 Japanese television series debuts
2018 Japanese television series endings
Pretty Cure